Triple Crossed is a 2013 mystery-thriller film directed by Sean Paul Lockhart, written by Linda Andersson, and starring Jack Brockett, Addison Graham, Sean Paul Lockhart, and Laura Reilly. The film is the story of a gritty and seductive take on one man's torment, the collateral damage of war and finding life after loss.

Plot
A man is out to kill a person he swore on his best friend's death bed to protect. Chris Jensen (Jack Brockett) is torn between his allegiance to his fallen friend, Tyler Townsend (Addison Graham), who died in Afghanistan, and Tyler's half-sister, who hires Chris to kill her late brother's gay lover. The lover, Andrew Warner (Sean Paul Lockhart), stands to inherit half of the family's multi-million dollar company left to him by Tyler. Tyler's half-sister Jackie Townsend (Laura Reilly) has other plans for the young and unassuming Andrew. All goes to plan even though Chris has fallen in love with the young Andrew. Andrew grows suspicious, the plan is revealed and it's every man and woman for themselves. A fortune will go to the last one standing.

Cast
 Ashley Ahn as Bartender
 Ward Bodner as Man Hitting Car Window
 Jack Brockett	as Chris
 Matthew Campbell as Tanner
 Joshua Dinner	as Bar Patron
 Addison Graham as Tyler
 Tellier Killaby as Kendra
 Jude B. Lanston as MP Officer
 Sean Paul Lockhart as Andrew
 Ryan Massey as Derek
 Steven Tylor O'Connor as Drug Dealer
 Laura Reilly as Jackie Townsend
 Chad Siwik as Himself
 Tammy Tolene as Girlfriend in car
 Cory Tyndall as Bar Patron
 Steven Vasquez as Bar Patron
 Jill Zimmer as Waitress

Reception
Michael D. Klemm of CinemaQueer said, "Triple Crossed is a low budget, yet somewhat nifty, sexual thriller. Its concept is good, and it’s a lot of fun as long as you don’t take it too seriously". David Hall of Gay Celluloid gave three stars and said, "Filled with some passionate scenes of man-on-man lip-service and more, backed by the vibrant music of Chad Siwik and filmed, in part, in the lush location of Topanga Canyon, California, this feature frankly ticks many of the requisite boxes on the "festival favourites" checklist". Tim Isaac of Big Gay Picture Show commented: "Triple Crossed may have its flaws, but it’s an entertaining thriller with a cute gay romance at its core." Amos Lassen of ReviewsbyAmosLassen wrote "Quite naturally there is a lot of tension but even more important is that the film presents the viewer with gay characters who fight for what they believe in".

References

External links
 
 

2013 films
American LGBT-related films
American mystery thriller films
2013 LGBT-related films
2010s mystery thriller films
2013 directorial debut films
Films shot in Los Angeles County, California
2010s English-language films
2010s American films